Stair is a village in Ayrshire, Scotland. It lies at the bottom of a glen beside the River Ayr at the north-west border of the 5,376 acre (22 km2) Parish of Stair where the River Ayr is joined by the Glenstang Burn.

History
The parish is known for its connection with the Dalrymples, Earls of Stair. The family first became associated with the village in 1450, when William de Dalrymple acquired the lands of Stair-Montgomery and built Stair House. Formerly part of the Parish of Ochiltree, Stair was made a separate parish in 1653 at the request of James Dalrymple, 1st Viscount of Stair.

Places of interest in the parish include Stair Brig built in 1745 and Stair House. Dalmore House stood overlooking the River Ayr until destroyed by fire in 1969.

The "Stair Fair" at the churchyard was the equivalent of the Mauchline Holy Fair and was equally wild with people travelling from miles around and staying several days until every last item of food and drink had been consumed. A "Fair Stair Sacrament" was an expression used to describe a good hearty meal at which everything was eaten for many years after the fair ceased to be held.

Stair Church
The Parish of Barnweill, in the old District of Kyle, was suppressed in 1673 and the larger part of the stipend was transferred to the minister of the newly erected Parish of Stair. Nearby Craigie had been disjoined from the Parish of Riccarton in 1647. It is said that the Earl of Stair was the prime mover in suppressing the parish because of the inconvenient horse ride he had to undertake to get to Barnweill Church from his home at Stair House. Until 1707 the Minister of Stair had to preach under an oak tree on the Fulton Estate to lawfully qualify for the stipends of Barnweil]. A number of the old Barnweill parishioners joined the Symington Church.

The original church of circa 1706, replaced in 1864, was very simple in character with an earthen floor, resembling an abandoned hay shed and only the belfrey on the gable end indicated its true purpose. It contained three lofts reserved for the local lairds, namely Barskimming, Stair and Drongan.  A manse was built in 1807, now renamed Glenstang, it was sold by the Church of Scotland in 1979.

Milton
At the old Clachan of Milton on the other side of the bridge from Stair which lies in South Ayrshire, there used to be an inn here at which Robert Burns would stop on occasion and here also was the end of the old pack horse road to Annbank that once followed the course of the river. Opposite the inn was once an old toll house and nearby was the thatched cottage in which Mailly Crosbie lived, onetime housekeeper at Stair House. The miller here was one of the Covenanter martyrs who gave his life by refusing to hand over his bible to the king's soldiers.

Links with Robert Burns
Margaret or Peggy Orr was a nurserymaid at Stair House and Robert Burns lent a hand as a 'blackfoot' with his friends courtship of this lady, however the engagement was brief and she later married John Paton, an Edinburgh shoemaker. In his first 'Epistle to Davie' entitled 'An Epistle to Davy, a Brother-Poet, Lover, Ploughman and Fiddler, Burns wrote :-

Catherine Stewart of Stair and Afton Lodge, the wife of Major-General Alexander Stewart, became aware of 'Robert Burns the poet' through his visits with David and she was the first member of the upper classes to acknowledge his ability and befriend him. Burns sent her a number of his poems in a document known as the 'Stair Manuscripts'.

Burns would visit the thatched cottage at the Clachan of Milton in which Mailly Crosbie lived, onetime housekeeper at Stair House and a friend from the days of David Sillars attempts at courtship. The family kept the handleless cup from which Burns used to drink as a souvenir.

Views in Stair

See also
 Trabboch
 Barnweill Church
 Dalmore House and Estate
 James Dalrymple, 1st Viscount of Stair (1619–1695), Scottish lawyer and politician
 John Dalrymple, 1st Earl of Stair (1648–1707), son of the previous
 John Dalrymple, 2nd Earl of Stair (1673–1747), son of the previous
 Loch of Stair
 Loch of Trabboch

References

Bibliography
Barber, Derek (2000). Steps through Stair. Stair Parish Church.
Boyle, A. M. (1996). The Ayrshire Book of Burns-Lore. Darvel : Alloway Publishing. .
Mcvie, John (1927). Burns and Stair. Kilmarnock : The Standard Press.
Nimmo, John W. (2003). Symington Village, Church and People. Darvel : Alloway Publishing. .

External links

Video footage of Trabboch Castle
Video footage and narration - Free Church of Stair
Stair Church 

Villages in East Ayrshire
Robert Burns